Forest Springs is an extinct town in Knox County, in the U.S. state of Missouri. The GNIS classifies it as a populated place.

Forest Springs had its start in 1882 when a mineral spa opened at the site. A post office called Forest Springs was established in 1882, the name was changed to Forestsprings in 1895, and the post office closed in 1899.

References

Ghost towns in Missouri
Former populated places in Knox County, Missouri